Palisaded neutrophilic and granulomatous dermaititis is usually associated with a well-defined connective tissue disease, lupus erythematosus or rheumatoid arthritis most commonly, and often presents with eroded or ulcerated symmetrically distributed umbilicated papules or nodules on the elbows.

See also 
 Skin lesion
 List of cutaneous conditions

References 

Connective tissue diseases